Solon Earl Low (January 8, 1900 – December 22, 1962) was a Canadian politician, farmer, teacher, and school principal in the 20th century.

Early life
Low was born in Cardston, District of Alberta, Northwest Territories, on January 8, 1900 to Sarah Ida (Barber) and James Paton Low. Low's father was a teacher, businessman, and participant in the Utah Constitutional Convention in 1895.

Low attended Cardston public schools and studied education at Calgary Normal College, the University of Alberta, and University of Southern California. At the University of Alberta, he took a lively interest in student activities including debate, basketball, and other sports. After his education he began teaching. He was married twice, the second time to Alice Fren Litchfield; together, they had five of his eight children.

Political life
Low was elected to the Legislative Assembly of Alberta in the 1935 Alberta general election that swept the Social Credit Party of Alberta to power. Low became provincial treasurer under Premier William Aberhart in 1937. Low brokered an agreement during the 1937 Social Credit backbenchers' revolt to continue the government through a three-month budget and to try to bring Major C. H. Douglas to Alberta. As a Minister, Low introduced Accurate News and Information Act on October 1, 1937, and was passed by the legislature on October 4, 1937, during a marathon session which lasted until 12:30 the next morning. Lieutenant-Governor of Alberta John C. Bowen reserved royal assent until the Supreme Court of Canada evaluated the act's legality. In 1938's Reference re Alberta Statutes, the court found that it was unconstitutional, and it never became law. Low was defeated in 1940 but regained a seat in a by-election in which George Woytkiw resigned for him. Low also held the Minister of Education position in Premier Ernest Manning's government in 1943-1944.

In 1944, he was acclaimed the first national leader of the Social Credit Association of Canada at the party's founding convention. Though there had been a group of Social Credit MPs in parliament since 1935 under the leadership of John Horne Blackmore, the party did not have its first national convention until 1944, when the national party was formally founded. He was first elected to the House of Commons in the 1945 federal election. Low represented Peace River, Alberta until he lost his seat, along with every other Social Credit Member of Parliament (MP), in the 1958 federal election. Low retired as party leader in 1961 and became a judge of the juvenile and family court in Lethbridge in 1961. He would die later in 1962.

Personal life
Low was a member of the Church of Jesus Christ of Latter-day Saints. His family moving to Edmonton in 1937 was a key event in the growth of the church in that city. His wife Alice was the first leader of the young women program in the Edmonton Branch.

Low contributed to Social Credit's reputation for anti-Semitism by numerous controversial comments. As Alberta treasurer, he once said:

"[A]nti-Semitism is spreading because people cannot fail to observe that a disproportionate number of Jews occupy positions of control in international finance, in revolutionary activities and in some propaganda institutions, the common policy of which is the centralization of power and the perversion of religious and cultural ideals."

Ending anti-Semitism, he said, would require Jews to denounce those "arch-criminals" in their midsts who are responsible for these initiatives.

In 1947, when Low was federal leader of the Social Credit party, he used a national Canadian Broadcasting Corporation (CBC) broadcast to lambaste "the international power maniacs who aim to destroy Christianity" and the "international gangsters who are day-to-day scheming for world revolution." He also claimed there was a "close tie-up between international communism, international finance, and international political Zionism." Low repudiated anti-Semitism in 1957 after he had criticized Canada for not fully supporting Britain and France in the Suez Crisis and also visited Israel.

References

External links

Social Credit Party of Canada leaders
Alberta Social Credit Party MLAs
1900 births
1962 deaths
Social Credit Party of Canada MPs
Canadian Latter Day Saints
Members of the House of Commons of Canada from Alberta
People from Cardston
Pre-Confederation Alberta people
Right-wing populism in Canada
Members of the Executive Council of Alberta
Canadian anti-communists
Finance ministers of Alberta